Arta is a city in northwestern Greece, capital of the regional unit of Arta, which is part of Epirus region. The city was known in ancient times as Ambracia. Arta is known for the medieval bridge over the Arachthos River. Arta is also known for its ancient sites from the era of Pyrrhus of Epirus and its well-preserved 13th-century castle. Arta's Byzantine history is reflected in its many Byzantine churches; perhaps the best known is the Panagia Paregoretissa (Mother of God the Consoling), built about 1290 by Despot Nikephoros I Komnenos Doukas.

Etymology

The origin of the city's name is quite uncertain. It's either derived from a corruption of the river Arachthos, or from the Latin word "artus" (narrow), or from the Slavic word "balta" (swamp).

History

Antiquity

The first settlement in the area of the modern city dates to the 9th century B.C. Ambracia was founded as a Corinthian colony in the 7th century B.C. In 294 BC, after forty-three years of semi-autonomy under Macedonian suzerainty, Ambracia was given to Pyrrhus, king of the Molossians and of Epirus, who made it his capital, using Ambracia as a base to attack the Romans. Pyrrhus managed to achieve great but costly victories against the Romans, hence the phrase "Pyrrhic victory" which refers in particular to an exchange at the Battle of Asculum. Nevertheless, Pyrrhus found the time and means to adorn his capital with a palace, temples and theatres. In 146 BC, Ambracia became part of the Roman Republic.

Middle Ages

Despite the existence of several churches from the 9th and 10th centuries, Arta is first attested only in 1082, when the Normans under Bohemond laid siege to the city. The origin and etymology of the name is uncertain and debated. In the Komnenian period, the city flourished as a commercial centre, with links to Venice, and rose to become a bishopric by 1157. The Jewish traveller Benjamin of Tudela visited the area in 1165.

By the end of the 12th century, Arta probably formed a distinct fiscal district (episkepsis) within the wider theme of Nicopolis. After the fall of Constantinople to the Fourth Crusade, it is recorded as the pertinentia de Arta in the Partitio Romaniae treaty of 1204, and assigned to Venice.

The Venetians did not take control, however, for in 1205 Michael I Komnenos Doukas came to the city, succeeded its previous Byzantine governor, and quickly established a new principality, which is known by historians as the Despotate of Epirus. Arta remained the capital of the new principality for most of its history, and flourished as a result. The city experienced considerable building activity, with the renovation of older churches and the construction of new ones, most notably the Church of the Parigoritissa and the Church of the Kato Panagia. Sometime after 1227 it received fortifications, and was the site of regional Church councils in 1213, 1219, and 1225. The 15th-century Chronicle of the Tocco describes it as "the center of a fertile agricultural region with many water buffaloes, cows, and horses". The city had trade links to Venice—a Venetian consul is attested in 1284 and 1314/19—and Ragusa, exporting dried meat, lard, ham, furs, and indigo. Archaeological finds also attest to a local ceramic industry.

After the Battle of Pelagonia in 1259, the city was occupied by the troops of the rival Greek successor state, the Empire of Nicaea, (which restored the Byzantine Empire in 1261) but was soon recovered for Epirus by John I Doukas. Another attack by the Byzantine emperor Andronikos II Palaiologos in 1292, by land and sea, was unsuccessful. In 1303, the city was besieged for a month by the Angevins under Charles II of Naples. In 1313, much of the city was destroyed in a great fire. In the next year, Byzantine troops under the pinkernes John attacked Epirus, including Arta.

In 1318, the last male-line descendant of Michael I, Thomas I Komnenos Doukas, was assassinated by his nephew, the Count of Cephalonia Nicholas Orsini, and Epirus passed to the Italian Orsini family. Nicholas was in turn murdered in 1323 by his brother John II Orsini. In 1331 Arta, as well as Leucas and other areas, were occupied by Walter VI of Brienne, and John Orsini was forced to accept Angevin suzerainty. John's death in 1335 left Epirus in the weak hands of the young Nikephoros II Orsini and his mother Anna Palaiologina, and the Byzantine emperor Andronikos III Palaiologos availed himself of the opportunity to occupy and annex Epirus.

Byzantine rule was unpopular, and in 1339 a revolt broke out, with Arta joining it, under a certain Nicholas Basilitzes. Andronikos III and his commander-in-chief, John Kantakouzenos, campaigned in person in Epirus and captured the rebel fortresses one by one, either by siege or through negotiations. By the end of 1340, Byzantine rule was restored, and John Angelos took his seat as imperial governor in Arta.

Aided by the Byzantine civil war of 1341–1347 and an outbreak of the Black Death that devastated the region, Arta with the rest of Epirus fell under the rule of the Serbian king Stefan Dushan in autumn 1347. Dushan's half-brother Simeon Uroš, who married John II Orsini's daughter Thomais Orsini, was appointed governor of Epirus. The city remained part of the new Serbian Empire until Dushan's death in 1355. Nikephoros II Orsini recovered Epirus in 1356/7, but his death in the Battle of Achelous against the Albanian tribes that had invaded the region, meant that Arta returned to the (rather nominal) rule of Simeon Uroš, who preferred to reside in Thessaly rather than Epirus. This left Epirus open to increasing Albanian migration, who soon captured most of Epirus, except for Ioannina. In 1367 or shortly after, Arta too was captured, and became the centre of the "Despotate of Arta", until 1374 under Peter Losha and then John Bua Spata. The Albanian rulers managed to withstand attacks by the Angevins (sometime between 1374 and 1384), as well as by the Grand Master of the Knights Hospitaller Juan Fernández de Heredia in 1378, but in 1384 the city was plundered by the Ottoman Turks.

From 1401/02, Carlo I Tocco, the ambitious Count of Cephalonia, began launching attacks on Arta, taking advantage of the Albanians' infighting. Despite the Albanians' calling on Ottoman aid, in 1416 Tocco captured Arta after a long siege. Having taken control of Ioannina in 1411, Tocco thus reunited the core of the old Epirote realm, and received recognition from both the Ottomans and the Byzantine emperor. After Carlo I's death in 1429, he was succeeded by his nephew Carlo II Tocco. In 1449, the city fell to the Ottomans.

Ottoman period

Under Ottoman rule, the town was called in Turkish Narda. It was occupied by Venetians in 1717 and the French in 1797, but the Ottomans retook it in 1799. Several battles took place near the city during the Greek War of Independence.

In 1776, the town was composed of approximately 8,000 to 10,000 Greeks, 200 Turks and 200 Jews. At the time, Arta specialized in producing products such as wheat, wine, tobacco and shipbuilding timber.

Modern era
The city was finally annexed to the Greek Kingdom in 1881 with the Convention of Constantinople.

In March 1944, most of the Jewish community (384 members at the time) was arrested by the Nazis and deported to the extermination camps.

Climate

Landmarks

Classical
The modern city is on the site of ancient Ambracia. Remains of the classic era include the ancient walls, the ruins of an ancient temple of Apollo, a small theatre, and remnants of the southwest cemetery.

Byzantine and later

The town's fortifications, including the Castle of Arta, were built by Michael I Komnenos Doukas in the early 13th century, but their present form is largely post-Byzantine. Secular architecture from the Byzantine period, including the palace of the Despots of Epirus, has vanished completely, but the city preserves numerous churches.

The most important Byzantine church is the cathedral Church of the Paregoretissa, built ca. 1290 by Nikephoros I Komnenos Doukas and his wife Anna Palaiologina Kantakouzene. Other important churches of the late Byzantine period are the Church of the Kato Panagia, built by Nikephoros I's father Michael II Komnenos Doukas, and the Monastery of Saint Theodora, housing the tomb of the city's patron, Theodora of Arta. Several other churches dating to the 9th and 10th centuries also survive in and around the city: Saint Basil of the Bridge, Saint Demetrios of Katsoures in Plisioi, the Panagia Blacherna monastery, the Panagia Vryoni in Neochoraki, the Red Church in Vourgareli, the Panagia of Koronisia in Koronisia and the Church of the Pantanassa in Filippiada.

Museums
Archaeological Museum of Arta
Church of the Paregoretissa
Folk museum 'Skoufas'
Historical museum 'Skoufas'
Private folk museum in Kypseli.
Archaeological museum of Koronisia

Education

Arta has several university departments belongs to the university of Ioannina.

Transportation
Arta is located NNW of Antirrio, Messolongi and Agrinio, NE of Preveza, SSE of Ioannina and nearly SW of Trikala.

Regular bus lines connect Arta with all bigger Greek cities.
(bus to Athens departs several times a day and trip takes about 5 hours)

The city is linked with the GR-5 (Antirrio - Ioannina) and the GR-30 which links with Peta and Trikala.
The Arachthos River flows to the west with its reservoir lying directly to the north.

Municipality

The present municipality Arta was formed at the 2011 local government reform by the merger of the following 5 former municipalities, that became municipal units (constituent communities in brackets):
Amvrakikos (Aneza, Vigla, Gavria, Kalogeriko, Koronisia, Polydroso, Rachi, Strongyli, Psathotopi)
Arta (Arta, Keramates, Kostakioi, Limini)
Filothei (Agios Spyridon, Kalamia, Kalovatos, Kirkizates, Rokka, Chalkiades)
Vlacherna (Vlacherna, Grammenitsa, Grimpovo, Korfovouni)
Xirovouni (Ammotopos, Dafnoti, Kampi, Pantanassa, Pistiana, Rodavgi, Skoupa, Faneromeni)

The municipality has an area of 457.248 km2, the municipal unit 47.493 km2.

Quarters of Arta
Agia Triada
Agioi Anargyroi
Agios Georgios Glykorrizou
Eleousa
Glykorrizo
Kato Panagia Artas
Marathovouni

Historical population

Notable people

Ancient 

Pyrrhus (318 BC-272 BC), general and king of Epirus
Epicrates of Ambracia (4th century BC), comic poet
Silanus of Ambracia (5th century BC), soothsayer in Xenophon's Anabasis
Epigonus of Ambracia (6th-5th BC), musician

Byzantine 

Michael I Komnenos Doukas, founder and first ruler of the principality of Epirus from 1205 until his death in 1215.
Theodore Komnenos Doukas, (died c. 1253), ruler of Epirus from 1215 to 1230 and of Thessalonica from 1224 to 1230.
 Theodora Petraliphaina, canonized as Saint Theodora of Arta; (ca. 1225 – after 1270),  consort of Epirus and Orthodox Christian saint.
 Michael II Komnenos Doukas, ruler of Epirus from 1230 until his death in 1266/68.
Nikephoros I Komnenos Doukas, (c. 1240 – c. 1297) ruler of Epirus from 1267/8 to c. 1297.
 Thomas I Komnenos Doukas,(c. 1285–1318) ruler of Epirus from c. 1297 until his death in 1318.
Jakob Bua Shpata Albanian ruler of Arta from 1414-1416.

Modern 

Maximus the Greek (1475–1556), monk, publicist, writer, scholar, humanist and translator
Nikolaos Skoufas (1779–1818), founder of the Filiki Eteria, from Kompoti
Theodoros Tzinis (1798–1869), fighter of the Greek War of Independence, from Kompoti
Azmi Ömer Akalın, Wāli of Bursa.
Hoca Ishak Efendi (1774–1835), Ottoman engineer and translator
Joseph Stephanini (1803-?) Greek-American author, runaway slave
Napoleon Zervas (1891–1957), WWII general and resistance leader
Konstantinos Karapanos (1840–1911), politician and archaeologist
Alexandros Karapanos (1873–1946), politician and diplomat
Yiannis Moralis (1916-2009), painter
Isaac Mizan (1927-2021), last Greek-Jewish survivor of the Auschwitz concentration camp
Olga Gerovasili, politician
Antonios Nikopolidis (1971), footballer
Angeliki Stogia, politician
Dimitris Tsironis (1960–2022), politician

Professional sports
Handball
https://web.archive.org/web/20070514042114/http://www.anagenisi-artas.gr/

Basketball
Pyrros Artas

Football
https://web.archive.org/web/20190207113340/http://www.anagenisiartas.gr/
https://web.archive.org/web/20061205033543/http://doxa-artas.gr/

Volleyball
https://web.archive.org/web/20070516144231/http://www.anagenisi-artas.gr/volley/
http://www.filia.gr/

See also
Despotate of Arta
Bridge of Arta
Arachthos River
Despotate of Epirus

References

Sources

External links
Arta Prefecture
Municipality of Arta on GTP Travel Pages (in English and Greek)
Arta (community) on GTP Travel Pages (in English and Greek)
Arta Season Bridge (discoverarta) (in English and Greek)
Archaeological Museum of Arta 

 
Greek prefectural capitals
Municipalities of Epirus (region)
Burial sites of the Komnenodoukas dynasty
Populated places in Arta (regional unit)